The canton of Angoulême-3 is an administrative division of the Charente department, southwestern France. It was created at the French canton reorganisation which came into effect in March 2015. Its seat is in Angoulême.

It consists of the following communes:
Angoulême (partly)
Soyaux

References

Cantons of Charente